Benvenuti al Sud is an Italian comedy film directed by Luca Miniero, remake of the French film Bienvenue chez les Ch'tis of two years earlier. The film has a sequel called Benvenuti al Nord. The film was dedicated to Angelo Vassallo, an Italian mayor murdered for his anti-crime campaign.

Plot
Alberto Colombo, postmaster of Usmate Velate in Brianza, fails to secure a transfer to Milan, which was given to a disabled colleague, much to the disappointment of both himself and his wife, who both wanted to move to the Lombardic capital for a number of reasons, including securing their son Chicco's future. In an attempt to get the transfer he feigns Paraplegia, however, he inadvertently stands up while meeting the inspector sent to verify his disability. As punishment, Alberto is transferred South to become postmaster  of the provincial village of Castellabate - described in the movie as being near Naples. Should he refuse this transfer, he would be dismissed.

Before moving, he informs himself as to the living conditions in the South with members of the Academy of the gorgonzola to which he belongs. Alberto is warned that there are many significant problems with the south. (mafia, garbage in the streets, stifling heat) After loading the car with: Fire extinguishers, sunscreen with a high protection, body armor, mousetraps, and hiding his wedding ring, Alberto departs for Castellabate. After a long Journey, exacerbated by a major traffic jam, in which he compares his situation to that of his brother, who fought in the Kosovo War, he arrives late at night, greeted by pouring rain. Despite his initial trepidation, he eventually befriends postman Mattia Volpe, Maria Flagello, and constables "Grande" (meaning "Large") and "Piccolo" (Meaning "Small"), and ends up appreciating the beauty and the lifestyle of the town, realising that all of the negative perceptions of the south that he held were mere prejudices.

However, he conveys the opposite impression to Silvia, who seems biased towards the south, and seeing an opportunity to strengthen their relationship, lies to her about conditions in the south, telling her that it is dangerous, unsanitary, and unpleasant. Silvia eventually decides to visit, and Alberto is forced to admit to his friends that he lied to his wife about the south, and spoke ill of them behind their backs. His friends initially resent him for what he did, but eventually the entire village decides to pull an elaborate ruse designed to give Silvia the impression that the south really is as bad as Alberto had been saying. The ruse works for some time, but then Silvia finds out and threatens divorce, thinking that Alberto was having an affair with Maria. 

However, with Alberto's encouragement, Mattia and Maria get back together, as do Silvia and Alberto. Alberto's family joins him in the south, and after some time he finally receives his long-awaited transfer to Milan. Though he and Silvia are happy to go home, they leave the south with heavy hearts.

References

External links

2010s Italian-language films
2010 films
Italian comedy films
Italian remakes of French films
Films set in Campania
Films directed by Luca Miniero
2010 comedy films